Keeton is an English surname. Notable people with the surname include:

Bob Keeton (1918–1996), English footballer
Cheryl Keeton (1949–1986), American lawyer
Chuckie Keeton (born 1993), American football player
Durwood Keeton (born 1952), American football player
Frederick Keeton (1855–1911), English cricketer
Haydn Keeton (1847–1921), American football player
John Keeton (born 1972), British boxer
Kathy Keeton (1939–1997), American magazine publisher
Kimberly Keeton, American computer scientist
Rickey Keeton (born 1957), American baseball player
Robert Keeton (1919–2007), American lawyer
Ruth U. Keeton (1919–1997), American politician
W. Page Keeton (1909–1999), American attorney
Walter Keeton (1905–1980), English cricketer
William Keeton (1933–1980), American zoologist
William D. Keeton (1884–1972), Justice of the Idaho Supreme Court

See also
Carole Keeton Strayhorn (born 1939), American politician
Peter Keeton Leisure  (1929–2013), American politician

English-language surnames